The Western Philatelic Library is located in Redwood City, California.

History 
The library was founded in 1969 and is chapter 836 of the American Philatelic Society.

The library has been designated an official project of Save America's Treasures.

In 2014, the library moved to 3004 Spring Street in Redwood City.

Legal status 
The library is registered with the United States Internal Revenue Service as a 501(c)(3) non-profit corporation and donations are treated as a charitable deduction for the purposes of United States Federal Income Tax.

Mission statement 
The library state on their website:

"The Western Philatelic Library exists to enhance the preservation and dissemination of philatelic knowledge by acquiring, organizing , interpreting and distributing information resources in a globally networked community. 

Our Commitments: 
to build and conserve a world class collection of printed, electronic and other media; 
to support, extend and enrich the pursuit of knowledge and enjoyment through stamp collecting; 
to provide access and support for beginners, hobbyists, specialists, writers, and postal historians; 
to promote knowledge through public educational events and displays; and 
to collaborate and cooperate with other libraries and philatelic groups throughout the world."

Collections 
As well as a general collection of philatelic literature, the library also contain several important historic collections, including part of the Hiram Edmund Deats library. Deats was born in New Jersey in 1870 and was a founding member of the American Philatelic Association which eventually became the American Philatelic Society. Deats was also the founding Librarian of the Collectors Club of New York.

Other special collections include the Tonga/Tin Can Mail Study Circle Library, the Society of Australasian Specialists/Oceania William H. Buckley Library which is the largest of its kind outside Australia and the Tannu Tuva Collectors Society Library.

2001 records list 13,000 books and pamphlets, 4000 bound volumes of journals, 2000 stamp catalogues, and 2000 auction catalogues in the library stock.

Journal 
The library publishes a bi-monthly journal, The Bay Phil, which includes book reviews and other relevant content.

External links 
Friends of the Western Philatelic Library
Visit to the library by newspaper The Sun 17 February 1999.

Philatelic libraries
1969 establishments in California
Sunnyvale, California